Pregnane, also known as 17β-ethylandrostane or as 10β,13β-dimethyl-17β-ethylgonane, is a C21 steroid and, indirectly, a parent of progesterone. It is a parent hydrocarbon for two series of steroids stemming from 5α-pregnane (originally allopregnane) and 5β-pregnane (17β-ethyletiocholane). It has a gonane core.

5β-Pregnane is the parent of pregnanediones, pregnanolones, and pregnanediols, and is found largely in urine as a metabolic product of 5β-pregnane compounds.

Pregnanes

Pregnanes are steroid derivatives with carbons present at positions 1 through 21.

Most biologically significant pregnane derivatives fall into one of two groups: pregnenes and pregnadienes. Another class is pregnatrienes.

Pregnenes

Pregnenes have a double bond. Examples include:
 Cortisone
 Hydrocortisone
 Progesterone

Pregnadienes

Pregnadienes have two double bonds. Examples include:
 Cyproterone acetate
 Danazol
 Fluocinonide

See also
 5β-Pregnane
 Pregnanedione
 Pregnanediol
 19-Norpregnane
 Androstane
 Estrane

References

External links
 
 
 PubChem
 Diagram at qmul.ac.uk
 Definition of Pregnane
 Progesterone Chemistry
 Progesterone record in European Bioinformatics database

Endocrinology